Blackmoor Farmhouse at Cannington, Somerset, England and the attached chapel, was built around 1480 for Thomas Tremayll. It was designated as a Grade I listed building on 29 March 1963. The farm now offers bed and breakfast accommodation and is a wedding venue.

Building
The farmhouse was originally built for Thomas Tremayll as a manor house, with integrated chapel, in approximately 1480. During the 16th century a porch was added, as well as a service wing. The interior was altered in the 19th century, adding windows to the rear of the property at the same time. The two story farmhouse is made of red sandstone rubble, with roughly cut quoins and rubble chimneystacks. The roof is slate ending in coped verges.

The front of the building has a number of bays ending in the chapel wing to the north, which includes tall lancet arch windows as well as an ogee-headed moulded stone door frame. The main entrance to the house is in one of the bays, with a studded door, in a similar ogee-headed moulded stone door frame. On the south side of the house there is a garderobe, also two storeys high, with a turret to the rear.

The building has many architectural features of its period with the roof structure comprising a series of jointed crucks together with some curved wind-braces still in place. There are coffered ceilings and a plank and muntin screen with soot blackening to one side now in one of the upstairs rooms (possibly re-sited from being a screens passage at the entrance to the main hall where one would expect to see this type of structure).

See also
 List of Grade I listed buildings in Sedgemoor

References

Houses completed in the 15th century
Grade I listed buildings in Sedgemoor
Grade I listed houses in Somerset